Andrea Michelle Velasco Barrera (born Jul 17, 1997) is a Salvadoran pole vaulter. She holds a personal best of 3.70m set at the 2019 NACAC U18 and U23 Championships in Athletics. She is a multiple gold medal winner in the pole vault at the Central American Championships in Athletics.

International competitions

References 

Salvadoran female athletes
Salvadoran pole vaulters
Place of birth missing (living people)
Living people
1997 births